Remain Silent  is a 2019 Chinese crime drama film directed and written by Zhou Ke, and starring Zhou Xun, Francis Ng and Zu Feng. It was released on August 23, 2019.

Synopsis
Wan Wenfang (Zhou Xun) was assassinated in Hong Kong during her performance. The suspect is a young man. Lawyer Duan Mulan took over the case and was ready to start the investigation, but in the process of investigation, she found that the prosecutor of the case is her former lover Wu Zhengwei (Francis). At the same time, she found the case to be suspicious, so she went to the young man's home to seek the truth, and fell into a series of trouble.

Cast
 Zhou Xun as Duan Mulan/Wan Wenfang
 Francis Ng as Wu Zhengwei
 Zu Feng as Tian Jingcheng
 Rooy Sun as Jimmy Thomas
 Kou Chia-jui as Li Guo
 Wang Tianchen  as Gang Qin
 Li Na as Luo Meihui
 Li Yuan as Bo Qu
 Swan Wen as Anne

References

External links
 

Chinese crime thriller films
2019 crime thriller films